Findern is a village and civil parish in the District of South Derbyshire, approximately 5–6 miles south of Derby. The population of the civil parish was 1,669 at the 2011 Census. The village was mentioned in the Domesday Book, when it was held by Burton Abbey as an outlier of Mickleover. A priory once stood near the church, where the monks were supplied with fresh food from the fishponds on Common Piece Lane. After the dissolution of the abbey the Fynderne family, as the principal land-owners, took ownership of the village and the remaining Chapel of Ease. The Fyndernes lived in a fortified manor house on Castle Hill, though none of the house remains.

Sir Geoffrey de Fynderne left the village to join the Crusades, and brought back the Findern Flower, which in the UK only grows in the village, and only in particular areas. The flower has become an emblem of the village and is represented in many guises, including the emblem of Findern Primary School on Heath Lane.

All Saints' parish church was rebuilt and consecrated in 1863, on the site of a Saxon chapel of ease, destroyed by fire. Built of sandstone, it stands adjacent to the village green. The church contains a monument to Isabella de Fynderne dated 1444, and also possesses the oldest parish communion plate in the UK. Findern also has a small Methodist chapel, built in 1835, close to the site of the old priory. The village previously also had an early 18th century Unitarian chapel, built just over five miles from Derby. At that time the law decreed that no Dissenting meeting house should be built less than that distance from the town. It was demolished in 1939.

Prior to the development of transport, the village was self-supporting and it was here, in 1740, that Jedediah Strutt came as an apprentice wheelwright. He had an obsessive interest in machinery, but when his uncle died and left him a small holding, he took it over and returned to Findern to marry Elizabeth Woollatt who lived at the old hall, where he had previously lodged. Later he went on to set up the mills and their communities at Belper and Milford, which now form an integral part of the Derwent Valley World Heritage Site.

The village historically had a strong weaving industry, with the majority of the cottages around the Green housing the looms. In 1846 there were as many as 22 velvet and silk looms in the village, but weaving had been known to have taken place in Findern as early as the 17th century Ivy Cottage, one of the oldest surviving properties in the village.

In 1694 an early school was started here by Rev. Benjamin Robinson, the local presbyterian minister (for which he was summoned to explain why to the bishop). Modern Secondary education is now provided for many at John Port Spencer Academy in the nearby village of Etwall.

Although all industry has left the village the Green remains the still the centre of the village, with the post office, village store and a handful of other services. Before the Parish Council took action in the 1950s to restore it the Green was in poor shape, divided into four small grassed areas, divided by tarmac paths and frequently used by vehicles. There were no records as to owned the land until ownership was traced to the Crown, and the land purchased for £50 by the Parish Council for the village.

There is a Neolithic cursus 1 ½ miles south of the village.

Findern previously had two pubs, the 'Wheel Inn' located on Main Street just off Longlands Lane and a second, formerly the 'Greyhound' on the bankside of the Trent and Mersey Canal. In addition to this a house located on the far-side of the canal was historically the oldest pub in the village.

The village is nowadays bounded on two sides by major A roads; the A38 and the A50. The former, to the north east, follows the course of the Roman road Icknield Street, while the latter passes to the south of the village centre and runs parallel to the canal. In contrast to the ancient route of the A38 the A50 road was laid only in 1997, with many villagers unhappy about the loss of fields and pleasant walks as a result. Since then the Findern Footpaths Group have made huge improvements to existing trails, created new footpaths, and been a key force for recording and preserving the local history of the village surroundings.

The nearest railway stations are Willington, Pear Tree and Derby. There is one level crossing: an automatic one on the parish border with Willington - there has been at least one fatality there. On the approach to the crossing a spur and basin have been created on the Trent and Mersey Canal, creating the UK's largest inland marina with berthing for 585 craft. Mercia Marina, with berths for several hundred narrow boats, is expected to have a great impact on the village and nearby Willington.

See also
Listed buildings in Findern

References

Villages in Derbyshire
Trent and Mersey Canal
South Derbyshire District